Pauls Stradiņš Jr. (born 1963) is a physicist at the National Renewable Energy Laboratory in Golden, Colorado, and a foreign member of the Latvian Academy of Sciences.

Currently he is the principal scientist and a project leader of the silicon photovoltaics group at NREL.  He leads a team that recently theorized that defects in photovoltaic cells could actually improve the performance of those cells.

He is the grandson of Pauls Stradiņš (17 January 1896 – 14 August 1958), a Latvian professor, physician, and surgeon who founded the Museum of the History of Medicine in Riga and whose image appears on a Latvian postage stamp and for whom hospitals and medical schools were named.

See also
 National Renewable Energy Laboratory

References

External links
 

1963 births
Living people
American people of Latvian descent
Silicon photonics
21st-century American physicists
Latvian physicists
Latvian inventors
Moscow Institute of Physics and Technology alumni
21st-century American inventors